Oare may refer to:

Places in England
Oare, Berkshire, near Newbury
Oare, Kent, near Faversham
Oare Marshes, internationally important nature reserve near Faversham
Oare Meadow, nature reserve in Oare managed by the Kent Wildlife Trust
Oare, Somerset, near Minehead
Oare, Wiltshire, near Marlborough

Other
 Oare (song), in Romanian popular music
 Oare Water, river in Somerset, England